Clarotes is a genus of claroteid catfishes native to East Africa.

Species 
There are currently two extant species and one fossil species recognized in this genus:
 Clarotes bidorsalis Pellegrin, 1938
†Clarotes eocenicus Murray & Holmes, 2021
 Clarotes laticeps (Rüppell, 1829) (Widehead catfish)

References

Claroteidae
Fish of Africa
Catfish genera

Freshwater fish genera
Taxa named by Rudolf Kner
Taxonomy articles created by Polbot